Maxim Lobanovszkij (born 18 January 1996) is a Hungarian swimmer. He competed in the men's 50 metre freestyle event at the 2018 FINA World Swimming Championships (25 m), in Hangzhou, China.

References

External links
 

1996 births
Living people
Hungarian male swimmers
Hungarian male freestyle swimmers
People from Yuzhno-Sakhalinsk
Swimmers at the 2020 Summer Olympics
Olympic swimmers of Hungary